The K.U. Observatory or Karachi University Observatory is located in the campus area of Karachi University. The KU space observatory is operated by the Institute of Space and Planetary Astrophysics. The space observatory was last built in 1995 as a part of Higher Education Commission of Pakistan. The KU Observatory can resist all seismological challenges as its pillars go 15 feet deep into the ground. The telescope has a motor that keeps pace with the movement of the earth making any object under view always visible without any readjustments.

Important observations

In 1976 an observation of comet Wardell-76a was first made. The comet has an orbital period of over 20,000 years. Initial measurements indicated that there is no chance of a collision with the earth.

References

External links
Karachi University Observatory
World Space Week at KU Observatory
Google Maps-KU Observatory

Space programme of Pakistan
Science and technology in Pakistan
Astronomical observatories in Pakistan
University of Karachi
1995 establishments in Pakistan